Keturah Sorrell (10 September 1912 – 30 March 2012) was a British opera singer and later a background actress.

Early life
Sorrell was born in Middlesbrough, North Riding of Yorkshire, England to John W Sorrell and Jenny Kennedy. She attended Middlesbrough High School.

Career as a singer
She sang in Gilbert and Sullivan productions for the Redcar Operatic Society and studied after her marriage in 1939 at the Royal College of Music where she was encouraged by George Dyson. After graduating, she joined Sadler's Wells Opera where she sang Esmeralda in The Bartered Bride opposite Peter Pears. Other leading roles at Sadler's Wells were in The Marriage of Figaro, Il tabarro, and Gretel in Hansel and Gretel.

In 1947, Sorrell became the principal soprano for the Intimate Opera Company. During World War II she toured with the Council for the Encouragement of Music and the Arts (CEMA), the precursor of the Arts Council of Great Britain and in 1950 she toured North America with Intimate Opera.

Career as an actress
At the age of 68 she embarked on a new career in television as a supporting artiste or uncredited extra. Though on a number of occasions she was credited at the end of the programme.

Her first appearance was in a Scottish wedding sketch in Not the Nine O'Clock News. She was a regular on the 1990s British sitcom series Waiting for God, appearing in over 25 episodes as a resident of the Bayview retirement home. She also appeared in The Bill, EastEnders, House of Cards, Drop the Dead Donkey, A Bit of Fry & Laurie, two episodes of Birds of a Feather, an early episode of One Foot in the Grave in 1990 as a participant in an evening yoga class, as well as in Victoria Wood's television film Pat and Margaret in 1994 as a resident in an old people's home.

Personal life and death
Keturah Sorrell's husband, Eric Sadler, whom she married in 1939, was a journalist; he died in 1999.

Sorrell died in 2012, aged 99. She was survived by her son, Paul K Sadler (born 1947).

References

External links

Recording Thomas and Sally; Keturah Sorrell, Frederick Woodhouse, Stephen Manton, The Intimate Opera Society; KBOX

1912 births
2012 deaths
People from Middlesbrough
Alumni of the Royal College of Music
English operatic sopranos